Adriana Paula de Almeida Arydes (18 April 1973), better known as Adriana Arydes, is a Brazilian singer and songwriter of Catholic Worship Music. She has 10 CDs and 2 DVDs recorded, in one of the most solid careers in Catholic music.

Biography
Adriana Arydes was born on Holy Wednesday, 18 April 1973, in Cruzeiro, São Paulo.

Her parents are José de Arimatéia and Dona Auxiliadora Maria, and Adriana says that the family had the habit of getting together to listen to music. Adriana's story of singing began at the age of 7, playing at the masses of the Bom Jesus chapel in her hometown of Cruzeiro (SP). She recalls that at that time there was no music at Mass. Mother and daughter played at the celebrations until the guitar teacher set up a children's choir, which Adriana attended for several years. As a teenager, he joined the youth group and became part of the band that animated the meetings.

In 1982, Arydes began participating in the Rebanhões, in Cruzeiro, organized by Father Jonas Abib and the Canção Nova Community.

12 years later, Arydes would start his career in Catholic music. In 1994, she became part of the Canção Nova Band, with which she animated the first camps, masses and Thursdays of worship of Canção Nova.

At that time, for the first time she entered a studio professionally, to record the LP "Deus Há", the first work of the band Canção Nova. During this period, he also recorded backing vocals for Codimuc record albums. In 1999, she was invited to release her first solo CD by Codimuc.

"Reencontro" opened the way for her solo career and hit the big hits "Morte de Cruz" and "Abraço de Pai." In 2001, she released her second work, also by Codimuc. "Qual é a Chave" has leveraged the singer's career with the classic, "A Chave do Coração", besides the super hits "Chamado", "Quem Perder Sua Vida a Encontrará", "Amor que não se cansa", "Se compreendesses dom de Deus", "Doce Jesus", "Pacto de Esperança", "Colo de Mãe", "Pra te louvar" and "Ponto de Partida".

In 2003, Adriana left Codimuc and released her first album by Paulinas-Comep. In addition to the theme track, "Lindo Céu" also featured some of the hits that are still in the public memory to this day. Among them, "Nova Unção", "Glória e Majestade", "Nada é impossível para ti" and the beautiful "Coroação de Nossa Senhora".

In 2005, she launched "Mais Feliz". Her fourth album featured the tracks "Humano Amor de Deus", "Consolo", "Nossa Missão" and "Nova Jerusalém", in addition to the re-recording of the classic "Olhos no Espelho" and the Italian version "Lindo Cielo".

Her first DVD came in 2007. Bringing together the big hits of her career, "Adriana Live" brought two unreleased songs: "Reunidos Aqui" and "Eternamente Grata". The following year, the album won DVD and Gold Disc, surpassing 25,000 DVDs and 25,000 CDs sold.

"Jardim Secreto", the singer's sixth work, came in 2009, featuring the hits "Milagre", "Tocar em tuas vestes", "Eu sou um Jardim" and "Teu amor é maior". In the same year, he married Fabiano, assuming the surname Arydes.

In 2011, Adriana Arydes released the album "Coisas que vivi" and once again achieved several hits. Among them, "Te farei vencer", "O Segredo", "Só é feliz quem ama", "Jesus, meu amigo" and "Tu és Santo".

In 2013, Adriana expressed on a record the most intense experience ever lived by her: “Ser Mãe”. This is the title of the eighth CD of the singer. A project specially produced to share the unique moment Adriana was living. Highlights include the tracks "Aprendendo a ser mãe", "Mãe do Eterno Amor" and, of course, the theme track, "Ser Mãe".
In addition, to career records, Adriana also released two collections: “Milagres”, released in 2009, by Som Livre record label, and “Adriana – Coletânea”, released by Paulina-Comep.

In 2014, the second DVD, “Adriana Arydes – Live”, brings together some of the biggest hits of the singer's career. One of the highlights of the album is the unreleased "Guardiões". The letter expresses the attitude of those who struggle to defend the family. Adriana says that the production of the DVD lasted more than two years. Another highlight is the song “Halleluyah”, which features guest appearances by Ziza Fernandes, Davidson Silva, Fatima Souza and Adelso Freire.

Discography

Singles
 Abraço de Pai – 1999
 Resgate – 2000
 A Chave do Coração – 2001
 Chamado – 2002
 Jovem Te Olho – 2003
 Lindo Céu – 2003
 Nova Unção – 2004
 Glória e Majestade – 2005
 Nova Manhã – 2005
 Nossa Missão – 2005
 Nova Jerusálem – 2005
 Humano Amor de Deus – 2006
 Reunidos Aqui – 2007
 Milagres – 2009
 Tocar em Tuas Vestes – 2009
 Teu Milagre – 2009
 Eu sou um Jardim – 2010
 Minha Graça te Basta – 2011
 Coisas que Vivi – 2012
 Ser Mãe... – 2013
 O Menor Da Casa Sou Eu – 2016
 Deus Está No Controle – 2018
 Sara Brasil – 2018
 O Poço - 2020

Tours

Awards and nominations

References

External links
 Adriana Arydes -
 Adriana Arydes Official Facebook Page

1973 births
Brazilian Roman Catholic singers
Brazilian Roman Catholics
People from Cruzeiro, São Paulo
Living people
Women in Latin music